The Chromocyphellaceae are a family of basidiomycete fungi described by mycologist Henning Knudsen in 2010.

Taxonomy
The family comprises the two genera Chromocyphella and Phaeosolenia, which previously belonged to the Inocybaceae, based on molecular evidence.

Morphology
Characteristic features of the family includes cyphelloid fruitbodies and brown, smooth or verrucose spores with germ pores or some callus formation.

References

External links

Agaricales families